Woolwich Polytechnic and Woolwich Polytechnic School are names shared by more than one institution:

 Woolwich Polytechnic School for Boys, a school located in Thamesmead, London
 Woolwich Polytechnic School for Girls, a school located in Thamesmead, London
 University of Greenwich, previously known as Woolwich Polytechnic